Howard Andree Van Vranken is an American diplomat who has been confirmed to serve as the United States Ambassador to Botswana.

Education 
Van Vranken earned a Bachelor of Arts degree from the University of California, Davis and a Master of Arts from Harvard University.

Career 
A career officer with the United States Foreign Service, Van Vranken has been assigned to embassies in Jerusalem, Sanaa, Oslo, Beirut, Tel Aviv, Belfast, and Tunis. He has also worked in the Bureau of Near Eastern Affairs and Bureau of South and Central Asian Affairs. He has most recently served as executive director and deputy executive secretary of the United States Department of State.

Ambassador to Botswana
On July 16, 2021, President Joe Biden nominated Van Vranken to be the next United States Ambassador to Botswana. On September 29, 2021, a hearing on his nomination was held before the Senate Foreign Relations Committee. On October 19, 2021, his nomination was reported favorably out of committee. The full Senate voted to confirm Van Vraken by voice vote on December 21, 2022, more than a year later.

Awards and recognitions
Van Vranken is the recipient of the Presidential Distinguished Service Award.

Personal life
Van Vranken speaks Arabic, Persian, and Norwegian.

References 

Living people
American diplomats
University of California, Davis alumni
Harvard University alumni
United States Foreign Service personnel
United States Department of State officials
Year of birth missing (living people)